Afrosymmoca is a moth genus in the family Autostichidae.

Species
 Afrosymmoca seydeli Gozmány, 1966
 Afrosymmoca straminea Gozmány, 1966

References

Symmocinae